WJYZ (960 AM) is a Christian radio station broadcasting a Gospel format. Licensed to Albany, Georgia, United States, the station serves the Albany area.  The station is owned by iHeartMedia, Inc. and features programming from Westwood One and Premiere Radio Networks.  Its studios are on Westover Boulevard in Albany, and the transmitter is located near the interchange of Slappney Boulevard at U.S. Highway 82 in north Albany.

History
The station went on the air as WGOP on February 6, 1987.  On March 11, 1988, the station changed its call sign to WJIZ; and on December 22, 1988, to the current WJYZ.

References

External links

JYZ
Radio stations established in 1987
Gospel radio stations in the United States
IHeartMedia radio stations
JYZ